Valan may refer to:

Valan, an Indian name

People
Merlyn Orville Valan (1926-2010), American farmer and politician

Places
Valan, Nordkapp, a village in Nordkapp Municipality, Finnmark county, Norway
Valan Airport, or Honningsvåg Airport, Valan, an airport in Finnmark county, Norway
Valan, Troms, a village in Kvænangen Municipality, Troms county, Norway
Valan, Iran, a village in Sistan and Baluchestan Province, Iran

See also
Valen (disambiguation), a similarly spelled name